The 2010–11 Montana Grizzlies basketball team represented the University of Montana in the 2010–11 NCAA Division I men's basketball season. The Grizzlies, led by head coach Wayne Tinkle, played their home games at Dahlberg Arena in Missoula, Montana, as members of the Big Sky Conference. The Grizzlies finished second in the Big Sky during the regular season, and advanced to the championship game of the Big Sky tournament. Montana lost to Northern Colorado in the Big Sky championship game.

Montana failed to qualify for the NCAA tournament, but were invited to the 2011 College Basketball Invitational. The Grizzlies were eliminated in the first round of the CBI in a loss to Duquesne, 87–76.

Roster 

Source

Schedule and results

|-
!colspan=9 style=|Exhibition

|-
!colspan=9 style=|Regular season

|-
!colspan=9 style=| Big Sky tournament

|-
!colspan=9 style=| CBI

Source

References

Montana Grizzlies basketball seasons
Montana
Montana
Montana men's basketball
Montana men's basketball